Old Snowy Mountain is located in the Goat Rocks on the border of Lewis and Yakima Counties, in the U.S. state of Washington. Old Snowy Mountain is within the Goat Rocks Wilderness in Gifford Pinchot National Forest and is flanked by the McCall Glacier on its eastern slopes while the smaller Packwood Glacier is just northwest of the peak. Additionally, the Pacific Crest National Scenic Trail is on the west slopes of the peak.

References

Mountains of Washington (state)
Gifford Pinchot National Forest
Goat Rocks
Mountains of Lewis County, Washington
Mountains of Yakima County, Washington